Manohar Lal Khattar (born 5 May 1954) is an Indian politician serving as the 10th and current Chief Minister of Haryana since 2014. He is a member of the Bharatiya Janata Party (BJP) and a former RSS pracharak. He represents Karnal constituency in Haryana Legislative Assembly since 2014.

Personal life
Khattar was born on 5 May 1954 in Nindana village of Meham tehsil in the Rohtak district of East Punjab, India into a Punjabi Hindu family. His family belongs to the Khattar clan of Aroras. His father, Harbans Lal Khattar, had migrated to the village from the Jhang district of West Punjab following the Partition of India in 1947. His family initially settled in the Banyani village of Rohtak district and took up farming.

Khattar completed his matriculation (final year of high school) from Pandit Neki Ram Sharma Government College, Rohtak. He then moved to Delhi, and ran a shop near Sadar Bazar while completing his bachelor's degree from University of Delhi.

Political career
Khattar joined Rashtriya Swayamsevak Sangh (RSS) in 1977 and became a full-time pracharak three years later. As a pracharak, he is a lifelong bachelor. He worked as a full-time pracharak for 14 years before moving to BJP, in 1994.

During 2000–2014, Khattar was Organizational General Secretary of the BJP in Haryana. during his tenure the state unit was also started a publication of Bhajpa Ki Baat magazine in October 2000.
   He was the Chairman of BJP's Haryana Election Campaign Committee for 2014 Lok Sabha Elections. Subsequently, he became a member of BJP's National Executive Committee. 

In 2014, Khattar was nominated as BJP's candidate from Karnal constituency for the Haryana Legislative Assembly election, 2014. The party's workers and supporters in Karnal launched a signature campaign, asking the party leadership to field a local candidate instead of him. His opponent, the Indian National Congress candidate and Deepender Singh Hooda, accused Khattar of being an "outsider" not native to Karnal. But Modi wave helped Mr. Khattar win elections by heavy margin.

In the elections, the BJP gained a majority in Haryana for the first time, and Khattar won his maiden election by a margin of 63,736 votes. During a party meeting, his name was proposed for the Chief Minister of Haryana post by Haryana BJP President Ram Bilas Sharma, seconded by other strong Chief Minister of Haryana claimant Rao Inderjeet Singh and supported by many MLAs. He became the BJP's first Chief Minister of Haryana after his swearing-in ceremony on 26 October 2014.

On 27 October 2019, Khattar was sworn in as the chief minister for the second time, after making an alliance with Dushyant Chautala's Jannayak Janta Party post 2019 Haryana Legislative Assembly election.

Major initiatives

Police reforms
Khattar announced that Haryana will have an all-woman police station in each district and around 500 woman constables will be recruited. He also started a 24×7 portal called Harsamay through which anybody can file a complaint online.

He has also suggested that Yoga to be a part of police constables training to help keep the police personnel mentally and physically fit. According to media reports, Khattar has said that Police recruitments would be made on Transparent Recruitment Policy (TRP) and 3,060 new houses would be constructed for police personnel at a cost of Rs 550 crore in next three years.

E-governance
Manohar Lal Khattar has introduced e-services through Common Service Centres including biometric attendance system in all the government offices through which attendance of all officers will be available online and monitored.

Indian reunification
In July 2022, Manohar Lal Khattar championed the cause of Indian reunification, declaring opposition to the partition of India. Khattar likened the present divisions in the Indian subcontinent to those of East and West Germany, which were dissolved with German reunification in the 1990s.

Women's empowerment
Manohar Lal Khattar's Government has been in news for taking steps to implement Beti Bachao, Beti Padhao Yojana scheme that was flagged off by India's Prime Minister Narendra Modi. The child gender ratio has been improved in Haryana since he assumed power. It is now 889 girls per 1,000 boys. "Efforts are being made to further take it (child gender ratio) to above 900," Khattar has said in a public statement.

Construction of memorial
Manohar Lal Khattar has publicly declared that his government will build a memorial to mark the sacrifice of Garud Commando Gursewak Singh, who was killed in a terrorist attack in Pathankot.

Controversies 
Manohar Lal Khattar is criticised for his remarks on rape and women issues. During his election campaign for 2014 polls in India, he said: "If they (women) want freedom, why don't they just roam around naked? Freedom has to be limited."

See also 
 Manohar Lal Khattar ministry (2014–)

References

External links

 Official Website of Manohar Lal Khattar
 Government of Haryana, Official website

1954 births
Living people
Chief ministers from Bharatiya Janata Party
Delhi University alumni
Chief Ministers of Haryana
Hindu activists
Indian Hindus
People from Rohtak district
Rashtriya Swayamsevak Sangh pracharaks
Haryana MLAs 2014–2019
Punjabi people
Bharatiya Janata Party politicians from Haryana
Haryana MLAs 2019–2024
Punjabi Hindus